Nico-Nicoyé is a Congolese football club based in Pointe-Noire, Republic of the Congo. They play in the Congo Premier League.

Football clubs in the Republic of the Congo
Pointe-Noire